The GEM of Egypt was a power shovel used for strip mining. Built in 1966, the machine had worked in the Egypt Valley coalfield, GEM being an acronym for “Giant Earth Mover” or “Giant Excavating Machine”.  It was one of only two Bucyrus-Erie 1950-B shovels built and one of two to use the knee action crowd, licensed from Marion Power Shovel in exchange to Marion's use of BE's cable crowd patent.

Operational history

The GEM had a 170' boom and a 130 cubic yard bucket which enabled it to dig roughly 200 tons per 'bite'.  The machine began work in January, 1967 for Hanna Coal, and was later purchased by Consolidated Coal in "Little Egypt Valley" near Barnesville, Ohio. The area was also where the GEM got its name.  The GEM of Egypt was one of three in the service of the Hanna Coal Company, which by 1970, had been strip mining in Ohio for decades. The other two power shovels were The Tiger and The Mountaineer.

Of the three, the GEM of Egypt was the largest of the power shovels in the Hanna Coal Company, of which it went into service via the official opening of the Egypt Valley mine in January 1967.  It was reported that an estimated 25,000 people traveled to the site, many from Ohio cities such as Cleveland, Akron, and Canton, as well as those from neighboring states. The Gem of Egypt was 20 stories tall and weighed 7,000 tons. Production there was expected to average 20,000 tons a day, which the company forecast would last for the next 30 to 40 years until the vein ran out. 

The machine was parked in 1988 and finally dismantled in 1991 off Ohio SR9 between New Athens and Fairpoint.  Parts of the shovel were used to keep its twin, The Silver Spade, operating until it too was retired.

Gallery

References

Stripping shovels
Coal mining in the United States
Engineering vehicles
Mining in Ohio
Bucyrus-Erie